The Simon & Schuster Mary Higgins Clark Award, established in 2001, is an American literary award, presented as part of the Edgar Awards. The award was created to honor author of suspense novels, Mary Higgins Clark.

To be eligible for the  Simon & Schuster Mary Higgins Clark Award, the book must be "written in the Mary Higgins Clark tradition according to guidelines set forth by Mary Higgins Clark:

 "The protagonist is a nice young woman whose life is suddenly invaded.
 "She’s self-made and independent, with primarily good family relationships.
 "She has an interesting job.
 "She is not looking for trouble–she is doing exactly what she should be doing and something cuts across her bow.
 "She solves her problem by her own courage and intelligence.
 "The story has no on-scene violence.
 "The story has no strong four-letter words or explicit sex scenes."

Recipients

2000s

2010s

2020s

References 

English-language literary awards
American literary awards
Awards established in 2001
2001 establishments in the United States